Henry Horton State Park is a state park located near Chapel Hill, Tennessee, United States. It was constructed in the 1960s on the estate of the former Governor of Tennessee Henry Horton. The park offers canoeing, camping, lodging, hiking and other activities.

Facilities

Lodging
Horton Park Inn - 65 rooms and 4 suites
Cabins - 8 total cabins within walking distance of inn
Campgrounds - 75 campsites, some located near the Duck River

Meeting/Conference
Recreation Building -  of meeting space is located in a separate building near the inn and is used for large meetings up to 300 people.
There are additional meeting rooms in the inn and restaurant.

Picnic
There are 83 picnic sites and 4 large group picnic pavilions.

Camping

Henry Horton features 75 campsites situated on the Duck River; 19 of these are primitive tent sites. The remaining 56 sites are RV sites with water and electric hookups. All sites have tables, grills, and fire rings. A large group tent camp site is also available. Two bathhouses are available seasonally.

Professional Trap and Skeet Range
Five skeet fields, two trap fields, and a lodge building with concessions, gun rental, and ammo are available. A picnic shelter is available for large shoots or related gatherings.

Restaurant
Henry Horton Restaurant is a family restaurant capable of seating 255 people and includes two private dining areas.

Sports Fields
Facilities for baseball, basketball, disc golf, tennis, and volleyball are available.

Swimming
The park features an Olympic-sized pool with bathhouses and a concession stand. There is also water access to the Duck River via a small ramp.

Fishing
Duck River anglers can catch largemouth and smallmouth bass, red-eye, and catfish. A valid Tennessee fishing license is required.

Trails
The park features four relatively flat, easy hiking trails, some with views overlooking the Duck River. 
The 1.3 mile Hickory Ridge Loop is located near the campground and traverses habitats ranging from oak-hickory forest to cedar glades. 
The 0.7 mile Wilhoite Mill Trail follows the Duck River among second growth woods covering an early mill community. 
The 1.7 mile Turkey Trail loop is the longest trail in the park. It winds through woods and old fields.
The 4.2 mile (there and back) Duck River Trail is the newest trail in the park, completed in 2011. 
All trails are relatively easy and are suitable for families and adults of all ages.

Duck River
The Duck River flows through the park.

Golf
The park contains the Buford Ellington Golf Course.

References

State parks of Tennessee
Protected areas of Marshall County, Tennessee